The Merrill–Cazier Library is an academic library serving the students of Utah State University and the community of Logan, Utah.

History
The Merrill–Cazier Library opened in September 2005. The building integrated the Cazier Science and Technology Library with a  expansion, replacing the 74-year-old Merrill Library. The library is named for Milton R. Merrill, former Utah State University vice president, and Stanford Cazier, former Utah State University president.

The original Merrill Library was built in 1930 by the Whitmeyer Company of Ogden, Utah and expanded in 1967. A second library, the Cazier Science and Technology Library, was added to campus in 1995.

The Merrill–Cazier Library recently marked its 100th anniversary as a regional United States Government document depository.

The Building
A central atrium connects the former Cazier Science and Technology library with the new construction allowing the two to work as one.

Recently labeled a "Smart Library" by Campus Technology magazine, the Merrill–Cazier Library offers a technology-rich environment with radio frequency identification tags (RFID), a self check-out system, an on site automated retrieval system, the Information Commons consisting of 150 computer workstations, group study rooms of which 14 are equipped with computers and large screen LCD displays, two multimedia suites, and two library instruction rooms with over 60 workstations.

BARN

An automated storage and retrieval system (ASRS) is an integral part of the building and allows for many years of collection development. Three aisles of shelves are served by three Storage and Retrieval Machines (SRMs) that can retrieve an average of 875 volumes a day. There is space to add a fourth row of shelves when it is needed. The BARN (Borrower's Automated Retrieval Network) was so named in reference to Utah State University's status as an agricultural school.

All of the Merrill–Cazier Library's bound journals, over 200,000 less frequently used books, and most of the microform are stored in the BARN. There are currently nearly 550,000 items with room to expand to approximately 1.5 million items.

References

External links
Merrill-Cazier Library

Library buildings completed in 2005
University and college academic libraries in the United States
Libraries in Utah
Federal depository libraries
Utah State University
Buildings and structures in Cache County, Utah
2005 establishments in Utah